Kateřina Kohoutková (born 23 October 1998) is a Czech professional racing cyclist. She rode in the women's madison event at the 2019 UEC European Track Championships.

References

1998 births
Living people
Czech female cyclists
Place of birth missing (living people)